Football in Finland is not, or at least has traditionally not been, the most popular spectator sport, which is in contrast to most European countries; it falls behind ice hockey, which enjoys a huge amount of popularity in the country. Football tops ice hockey in the number of registered players (115,000 vs. 60,000) and as a popular hobby (160,000 vs. 90,000 in adults and 230,000 vs. 105, 000 in youth). It is the most popular hobby among 3-18 year olds, whereas ice hockey is 9th.

Football's standing is constantly increasing, especially among girls and women, where the yearly growth rate has lately been over 10 percent. In season 2006–07 19.9 percent of registered players were female.  The Football Association of Finland has approximately one thousand member clubs. According to a Gallup poll, nearly 400,000 people include football in their hobbies.

History 

Football developed in Finland in the early twentieth century when Finland was still part of the Russian Empire. Following the Bolshevik seizure of power in the October Revolution in November 1917, the Independence of Finland was recognised by the Russian Soviet Federative Socialist Republic in January 1918.
Football was first brought to Finland in the 1890s by English sailors, and it was first played in Turku. The first national competition in the sport was set up in 1906, and won by a school team from Turku. The Football Association of Finland was founded in 1907 and it joined FIFA the following year. Due to the sport's historically low status in Finland, the country has never really excelled in football. Only since the 1980s, due to the revival of Finnish football, has the country produced such international stars as Jari Litmanen, Antti Niemi, Sami Hyypiä, Mikael Forssell, Mixu Paatelainen, Teemu Tainio and Jussi Jääskeläinen.

Domestic club competitions 

The highest division in Finnish men's football is the Veikkausliiga, comprising 12 professional football teams. Below that is a league system maintained by the Finnish Football Association, with Ykkönen, or First Division, as the second highest division, with 10 teams. Beneath Ykkönen, each division is divided into 'groups' based on the location of the clubs. For instance, the Second Division, or Kakkonen, has 40 teams divided into four regional groups, each of 10 teams.

The Finnish Cup is Finland's national cup competition, open to all member clubs of the Finnish Football Association. In the 2009 season, 356 clubs signed up to take part in the competition.

All Finnish domestic football competitions take place in the spring, summer and autumn, due to weather conditions. Similar systems are used in the other Nordic countries as well, except for Denmark which had that system in the past.

National team 

The Finland national team played its first international match in 1911 against Sweden. Finland was still then a Grand Duchy part of the Russian Empire, and became independent in 1917. Finland have played in a few Olympic Games, finishing fourth in 1912, but have so far never qualified for the FIFA World Cup. Finland qualified to UEFA European Championship for the first time in 2020.

The Football Association of Finland also organizes national under-19 and under-21 teams.

The Finland women's national football team made their competitive debut in the 1984 European Competition for Women's Football qualification. To date, their most successful competition has been UEFA Women's Euro 2005, where they reached the semi-finals stage.

Åland Islands 

Since 1943 the Åland Football Association (ÅFA) has organized football in Åland. The ÅFA is a district association of the Football Association of Finland. However, the Åland Islands fields independent men's and women's national teams, principally competing in the Island Games.

Football stadiums in Finland

References

External links
 Football Association of Finland
 Finnish football blog
 Escape To Suomi
 League321.com - Finnish football league tables, records & statistics database. 
flashscore - Football Finnish league - Finland Live Scores, Results.